Doubrava (i.e. oak grove in Czech) may refer to:

Places in the Czech Republic
Doubrava (Karviná District), a municipality and village, Moravian-Silesian Region
Doubrava (Aš), a village and part of Aš, Karlovy Vary Region
Doubrava, a village and part of Chrášťany (České Budějovice District), South Bohemian Region
Doubrava, a village and part of Hořice, Hradec Králové Region
Doubrava, a village and part of Kostomlátky, Central Bohemian Region
Doubrava, a village and part of Lipová (Cheb District), Karlovy Vary Region
Doubrava, a village and part of Nýřany, Plzeň Region
Doubrava, a village and part of Puclice, Plzeň Region
Doubrava, a village and part of Vlachovo Březí, South Bohemian Region
Doubrava, a village and part of Žďár (Mladá Boleslav District), Central Bohemian Region
Karlov t. Doubrava, a village and part of Vidice (Kutná Hora District), Central Bohemian Region

People
Jaroslav Doubrava, a Czech composer

See also
 
Doubravka
Dubrava
Dąbrowa
Dúbravka
Dąbrówka